CSD Puerto San José is a Guatemalan football club from Puerto San José, Escuintla Department. It has played several seasons at the Liga Nacional de Fútbol de Guatemala being a great representative of the Escuintla Department. It currently plays on the Primera División de Ascenso, second tier on Guatemalan football.

Current squad

References 

futbolya.com
es.besoccer.com
es.soccerway.com
http://fedefutguate.org

Football clubs in Guatemala